Richard Thomas Chizmar (born 1965) is an American writer, the publisher and editor of Cemetery Dance magazine, and the owner of Cemetery Dance Publications. He also edits anthologies, produces films, writes screenplays, and teaches writing.

Writing
Richard Chizmar is a New York Times, USA Today, Wall Street Journal, Washington Post, Amazon, and Publishers Weekly bestselling author.

He is the co-author (with Stephen King) of the novella, Gwendy's Button Box and the founder/publisher of Cemetery Dance magazine and the Cemetery Dance Publications book imprint. He has edited more than 35 anthologies and his short fiction has appeared in dozens of publications, including multiple editions of Ellery Queen’s Mystery Magazine and The Year’s 25 Finest Crime and Mystery Stories. He has won two World Fantasy awards, four International Horror Guild awards, and the HWA’s Board of Trustee’s award.

Chizmar (in collaboration with Johnathon Schaech) has also written screenplays and teleplays for United Artists, Sony Screen Gems, Lions Gate, Showtime, NBC, and many other companies. He has adapted the works of many bestselling authors including Stephen King, Peter Straub, and Bentley Little.

Chizmar is also the creator/writer of the online website, Stephen King Revisited. His fourth short story collection, The Long Way Home, was published in 2019. With Brian Freeman, Chizmar is co-editor of Dark Screams horror anthology series published by Random House imprint, Hydra.

His latest book, The Girl on the Porch, was released in hardcover by Subterranean Press, and Widow’s Point, a novella about a haunted lighthouse written with his son, Billy Chizmar, was recently adapted into a feature film.

Chizmar’s work has been translated into more than fifteen languages throughout the world, and he has appeared at numerous conferences as a writing instructor, guest speaker, panelist, and guest of honor.

Publishing

Cemetery Dance magazine

Chizmar started Cemetery Dance magazine in 1988, which is still published today. It features dark fantasy, horror fiction, and articles related to those subjects.  Metro Silicon Valley called it "America's longest-running independent horror-themed magazine".

Cemetery Dance Publications

Chizmar's Cemetery Dance Publications started in 1992, and still publishes books. It has produced more than 300 different autographed limited edition, lettered edition hardcover novels, novellas, and anthologies. It also publishes chapbooks, trade hardcovers, and a few paperbacks.

Screenplays and Chesapeake films
Richard Chizmar co-founded Chesapeake Films with Johnathon Schaech.  He also co-writes screenplays with Schaech. Some of their produced screenplays include 2006's Road House 2 (based on the story by Miles Chapman) and Showtime's Masters of Horror presentation of The Washingtonians (based on Bentley Little's story) from 2007.  They also wrote the screenplay for an unproduced adaptation of  From a Buick 8 based on Stephen King's novel.

Selected awards

Won
 1991 World Fantasy Special Award – Non-Professional (for Cemetery Dance magazine)
1997 Horror Writers Association Specialty Press Award (for Cemetery Dance Magazine)
1999 World Fantasy Special Award – Non-Professional (for Cemetery Dance Publications)
2001 International Horror Guild Awards Best Anthology (for October Dreams: A Celebration of Halloween)
2002 International Horror Guild Awards Best Anthology (for Night Visions 10)

Nominated
Bram Stoker Award for Best Anthology 1998 (for Best of Cemetery Dance)
Bram Stoker Award for Best Anthology 2001 (for Trick or Treat: A Collection of Halloween Novellas)
Bram Stoker Award for Best Anthology 2002 (Shivers)
Bram Stoker Award for Best Anthology 2004 (Shivers III)

Selected bibliography

Novels
 Blood Brothers (1997) – a chapbook from Subterranean Press available only as 250 signed numbered copies (no ISBN)
 Unearthed, co-written with Brian Keene (2016) – a chapbook from Apokrupha
 Gwendy's Magic Feather (2019)
 Chasing the Boogeyman (released in August 2021)
 Gwendy's Final Task (written with Stephen King and released in February 2022)

Novellas 

 The Girl on the Porch (2019)
 Widow's Point (written with Billy Chizmar)
 Gwendy's Button Box (written with Stephen King)
 Darkness Whispers (written with Brain James Freeman)
 Brothers (written with Ed Gorman)
 Dirty Coppers

Screenplays
Heroes (2002) (co-written with Johnathon Schaech)
Road House 2 (Sony Pictures Home Entertainment, 2006) (co-written with Johnathon Schaech, and based on a story by Miles Chapman)
Masters of Horror The Washingtonians (Showtime, 2007) (co-written with Johnathon Schaech, and based on a story by Bentley Little)
The Poker Club (co-written with Johnathon Schaech, and based on the story by Ed Gorman)
Fear Itself: Eater (NBC/AXN Sci Fi, 2009) (co-written with Johnathon Schaech, and based on the story by Peter Crowther)
Fear Itself: The Circle (NBC/AXN Sci Fi, 2009) (co-written with Johnathon Schaech, and based on the story by Lewis Shiner)
From A Buick 8 (in production 2009) (co-written with Johnathon Schaech, and based on the novel by Stephen King)
Black House (in production 2009) (co-written with Johnathon Schaech, and based on the novel by Stephen King and Peter Straub)
Gone (2017) (co-written with Billy Chizmar)
Murder House (2018) (co-written and co-directed with Billy Chizmar)

Short stories

Uncollected short stories
"Billy's Day" from the magazine Witness to the Bizarre No. 2 edited by Melinda Jaeb (1988)

Short story collections
The Vault (originally published by Thunderstorm Books; U.S. limited hardcover/trade paperback; June 2019, reprinted by Grey Gull Publications; German hardcover/eBook; forthcoming in 2021)
The Long Way Home (originally published by PS Publishing; U.K. hardcover/eBook; 2018, reprinted by Cemetery Dance Publications; U.S. trade paperback; July 2019)
Silverwood: The Door (Serial Box based on the video series from Tony Valenzuela's Black Box TV)
A Long December (originally published by Subterranean Press; hardcover/eBook; 2016)
Midnight Promises (Gauntlet Press, 1996). .
Monsters and Other Stories (Subterranean Press, 1998). .

Anthologies as editor
The Best of Cemetery Dance (Cemetery Dance Publications, 1998). .
The Best of Cemetery Dance, Volume 2 (Roc Books, 2001). .
Cemetery Dance: A Fifteen Year Celebration (Cemetery Dance Publications, forthcoming 2010). .
Cold Blood (Mark V. Ziesing, 1991). .
The Earth Strikes Back: New Tales of Ecological Horror (Mark V. Ziesing, 1994). .
In Laymon's Terms (co-edited with Kelly Laymon, Steve Gerlach) (Cemetery Dance Publications, forthcoming 2010). .
Legacies (Cemetery Dance Publications, forthcoming 2010). .
Night Visions 10 (Subterranean Press, 2001). ISBN.
October Dreams: A Celebration of Halloween (co-edited with Robert Morrish) (Cemetery Dance Publications, 2000). .
Screamplays (with Martin H. Greenberg) (Ballantine Del Rey, 1997). . Limited Edition forthcoming from Cemetery Dance Publications in 2010. .
Smoke and Mirrors (Cemetery Dance Publications, forthcoming 2010). .
Shocklines: Fresh Voices In Terror (Cemetery Dance Publications, forthcoming 2010) (with Matt Schwartz). .
Subterranean Gallery: Stories of Horror and Crime (Subterranean Press, 1999) (with William Schafer)
Thrillers (Cemetery Dance Publications, 1993). .
Trick or Treat: A Collection of Halloween Novellas  (Cemetery Dance Publications, 2001). .

Shivers series
All released as trade paperbacks from Cemetery Dance Publications:
Shivers (2002). .
Shivers II (2003). .
Shivers III (2004). .
Shivers IV (2006). .
Shivers V (2009). .
Shivers VI (2011). .
Shivers VII (2013). .
Shivers VIII (2019). .

See also
List of horror fiction authors

References

External links

American magazine editors
American screenwriters
American horror writers
American speculative fiction editors
American speculative fiction publishers (people)
American publishers (people)
World Fantasy Award-winning writers
1965 births
Living people
Male speculative fiction editors